In mathematical physics, Minkowski space (or Minkowski spacetime) combines inertial space and time manifolds (x,y) with a non-inertial reference frame of space and time (x',t') into a four-dimensional model relating a position (inertial frame of reference) to the field (physics). A four-vector (x,y,z,t) consisting of coordinate axes such as a Euclidean space plus time may be used with the non-inertial frame to illustrate specifics of motion, but should not be confused with the spacetime model generally. 
The model helps show how a spacetime interval between any two events is independent of the inertial frame of reference in which they are recorded. Although initially developed by mathematician Hermann Minkowski for Maxwell's equations of electromagnetism, the mathematical structure of Minkowski spacetime was shown to be implied by the postulates of special relativity.

Minkowski space is closely associated with Einstein's theories of special relativity and general relativity and is the most common mathematical structure on which special relativity is formulated. While the individual components in Euclidean space and time may differ due to length contraction and time dilation, in Minkowski spacetime, all frames of reference will agree on the total distance in spacetime between events. Because it treats time differently than it treats the 3 spatial dimensions, Minkowski space differs from four-dimensional Euclidean space.

In 3-dimensional Euclidean space, the isometry group (the maps preserving the regular Euclidean distance) is the Euclidean group. It is generated by rotations, reflections and translations. When time is appended as a fourth dimension, the further transformations of translations in time and Lorentz boosts are added, and the group of all these transformations is called the Poincaré group. Minkowski's model follows special relativity where motion causes time dilation changing the scale applied to the frame in motion and shifts the phase of light.  

Spacetime is equipped with an indefinite non-degenerate bilinear form, variously called the Minkowski metric, the Minkowski norm squared or Minkowski inner product depending on the context. The Minkowski inner product is defined so as to yield the spacetime interval between two events when given their coordinate difference vector as argument. Equipped with this inner product, the mathematical model of spacetime is called Minkowski space. The group of transformations for Minkowski space, preserving the spacetime interval (as opposed to the spatial Euclidean distance) is the Poincaré group.

History

Complex Minkowski spacetime

The four-dimensional spacetime can be visualized as a four-dimensional sphere, with each point on the sphere representing an event in spacetime. The Lorentz transformations can then be thought of as rotations of this four-dimensional sphere, where the rotation axis corresponds to the direction of relative motion between the two observers and the rotation angle is related to their relative velocity.

To see this, consider the coordinates of an event in spacetime represented as a four-vector (t, x, y, z). A Lorentz transformation can be represented as a matrix that acts on the four-vector and changes its components. This matrix can be thought of as a rotation matrix in four-dimensional space, which rotates the four-vector about a particular axis.

Poincaré set  for convenience. Rotations in planes spanned by two space unit vectors appear in coordinate space as well as in physical spacetime as Euclidean rotations, and are interpreted in the ordinary sense. The "rotation" in a plane spanned by a space unit vector and a time unit vector, while formally still a rotation in coordinate space, is a Lorentz boost in physical spacetime with real inertial coordinates. The analogy with Euclidean rotations is only partial since the radius of the sphere is actually imaginary which turns rotations into rotations in hyperbolic space
(see hyperbolic rotation).

This idea, which was mentioned only  briefly by Poincaré, was elaborated by Minkowski in a paper in German published in 1908 called  "The Fundamental Equations for Electromagnetic Processes in Moving Bodies". Minkowski, using this formulation, restated the then-recent theory of relativity of Einstein. In particular, by restating the Maxwell equations as a symmetrical set of equations in the four variables  combined with redefined vector variables for electromagnetic quantities, he was able to show directly and very simply their invariance under Lorentz transformation. He also made other important contributions and used matrix notation for the first time in this context.
From his reformulation he concluded that time and space should be treated equally, and so arose his concept of events taking place in a unified four-dimensional spacetime continuum.

Real Minkowski spacetime 
In a further development in his 1908 "Space and Time" lecture, Minkowski gave an alternative formulation of this idea that used a real time coordinate instead of an imaginary one, representing the four variables  of space and time in coordinate form in a four dimensional real vector space. Points in this space correspond to events in spacetime. In this space, there is a defined light-cone associated with each point, and events not on the light-cone are classified by their relation to the apex as spacelike or timelike. It is principally this view of spacetime that is current nowadays, although the older view involving imaginary time has also influenced special relativity.

In the English translation of Minkowski's paper, the Minkowski metric as defined below is referred to as the line element. The Minkowski inner product of below appears unnamed when referring to orthogonality (which he calls normality) of certain vectors, and the Minkowski norm squared is referred to (somewhat cryptically, perhaps this is translation dependent) as "sum".

Minkowski's principal tool is the Minkowski diagram, and he uses it to define concepts and demonstrate properties of Lorentz transformations (e.g. proper time and length contraction) and to provide geometrical interpretation to the generalization of Newtonian mechanics to relativistic mechanics. For these special topics, see the referenced articles, as the presentation below will be principally confined to the mathematical structure (Minkowski metric and from it derived quantities and the Poincaré group as symmetry group of spacetime) following from the invariance of the spacetime interval on the spacetime manifold as consequences of the postulates of special relativity, not to specific application or derivation of the invariance of the spacetime interval. This structure provides the background setting of all present relativistic theories, barring general relativity for which flat Minkowski spacetime still provides a springboard as curved spacetime is locally Lorentzian.

Minkowski, aware of the fundamental restatement of the theory which he had made, said

Though Minkowski took an important step for physics, Albert Einstein saw its limitation:

Causal structure

A vector is timelike if , spacelike if , and null or lightlike if . The classification of any vector will be the same in all frames of reference that are related by a Lorentz transformation (but not by a general Poincaré transformation because the origin may then be displaced) because of the invariance of the interval.

The set of all null vectors at an event of Minkowski space constitutes the light cone of that event. Given a timelike vector , there is a worldline of constant velocity associated with it, represented by a straight line in a Minkowski diagram.

Once a direction of time is chosen, timelike and null vectors can be further decomposed into various classes. For timelike vectors one has
 future-directed timelike vectors whose first component is positive, (tip of vector located in absolute future in figure) and
 past-directed timelike vectors whose first component is negative (absolute past).
Null vectors fall into three classes:
 future-directed null vectors whose first component is positive (upper light cone), and
 past-directed null vectors whose first component is negative (lower light cone).
Together with spacelike vectors there are 6 classes in all.

An orthonormal basis for Minkowski space necessarily consists of one timelike and three spacelike unit vectors. If one wishes to work with non-orthonormal bases it is possible to have other combinations of vectors. For example, one can easily construct a (non-orthonormal) basis consisting entirely of null vectors, called a null basis.

Vector fields are called timelike, spacelike or null if the associated vectors are timelike, spacelike or null at each point where the field is defined.

Properties of time-like vectors 

Time-like vectors have special importance in the theory of relativity as they correspond to events which are accessible to the observer at (0, 0, 0, 0) with a speed less than that of light. Of most interest are time-like vectors which are similarly directed i.e. all either in the forward or in the backward cones. Such vectors have several properties not shared by space-like vectors. These arise because both forward and backward  cones are convex whereas the space-like region is not convex.

Scalar product 

Positivity of scalar product: An important property is that the scalar product of two similarly directed time-like vectors is always positive. This can be seen from the reversed Cauchy–Schwarz inequality below. It follows that if the scalar product of two vectors is zero then one of these at least, must be space-like. The scalar product of two space-like vectors can be positive or negative as can be seen by considering the product of two space-like vectors having orthogonal spatial components and times either of different or the same signs.

Using the positivity property of time-like vectors it is easy to verify that a linear sum with positive coefficients of similarly directed time-like vectors is also similarly directed time-like (the sum remains within the light-cone because of convexity).

Norm and reversed Cauchy inequality 

The norm of a time-like vector  is defined as

The reversed Cauchy inequality is another consequence of the convexity of either light-cone.  For two distinct similarly directed time-like vectors  and  this inequality is

or algebraically,

From this the positivity property of the scalar product can be seen.

The reversed triangle inequality 

where the equality holds when the vectors are linearly dependent.

The proof uses the algebraic definition with the reversed Cauchy inequality:

The result now follows by taking the square root on both sides.

Mathematical structure 
It is assumed below that spacetime is endowed with a coordinate system corresponding to an inertial frame. This provides an origin, which is necessary in order to be able to refer to spacetime as being modeled as a vector space. This is not really physically motivated in that a canonical origin ("central" event in spacetime) should exist. One can get away with less structure, that of an affine space, but this would needlessly complicate the discussion and would not reflect how flat spacetime is normally treated mathematically in modern introductory literature.

The tangent space at each event is a vector space of the same dimension as spacetime, .

Tangent vectors 

In practice, one need not be concerned with the tangent spaces. The vector space nature of Minkowski space allows for the canonical identification of vectors in tangent spaces at points (events) with vectors (points, events) in Minkowski space itself. See e.g.  or  These identifications are routinely done in mathematics. They can be expressed formally in Cartesian coordinates as

with basis vectors in the tangent spaces defined by

The first identification is the canonical identification of vectors in the tangent space at any point with vectors in the space itself. The appearance of basis vectors in tangent spaces as first order differential operators is due to this identification. It is motivated by the observation that a geometrical tangent vector can be associated in a one-to-one manner with a directional derivative operator on the set of smooth functions. This definition of tangent vectors is not the only possible one as ordinary n-tuples can be used as well.

This is the same way in which the coordinates  transform. Explicitly,

This definition is equivalent to the definition given above under a canonical isomorphism.

They offer various degree of sophistication (and rigor) depending on which part of the material one chooses to read.

Metric signature 
The metric signature refers to which sign the Minkowski inner product yields when given space (spacelike to be specific, defined further down) and time basis vectors (timelike) as arguments. Further discussion about this theoretically inconsequential, but practically necessary, choice for purposes of internal consistency and convenience is deferred to the hide box below.

In general, but with several exceptions, mathematicians and general relativists prefer spacelike vectors to yield a positive sign, while particle physicists tend to prefer timelike vectors to yield a positive sign, . Authors covering several areas of physics, e.g. Steven Weinberg and Landau and Lifshitz ( and  respectively) stick to one choice regardless of topic. Arguments for the former convention include "continuity" from the Euclidean case corresponding to the non-relativistic limit . Arguments for the latter include that minus signs, otherwise ubiquitous in particle physics, go away. Yet other authors, especially of introductory texts, e.g. , do not choose a signature at all, but instead opt to coordinatize spacetime such that the time coordinate (but not time itself!) is imaginary. This removes the need of the explicit introduction of a metric tensor (which may seem as an extra burden in an introductory course), and one needs not be concerned with covariant vectors and contravariant vectors (or raising and lowering indices) to be described below. This works in the flat spacetime of special relativity, but not in the curved spacetime of general relativity, see  (who, by the way use ). MTW also argues that it hides the true indefinite nature of the metric and the true nature of Lorentz boosts, which aren't rotations. It also needlessly complicates the use of tools of differential geometry that are otherwise immediately available and useful for geometrical description and calculation – even in the flat spacetime of special relativity, e.g. of the electromagnetic field.

Terminology 
Mathematically associated to the bilinear form is a tensor of type  at each point in spacetime, called the Minkowski metric. The Minkowski metric, the bilinear form, and the Minkowski inner product are all the same object; it is a bilinear function that accepts two (contravariant) vectors and returns a real number. In coordinates, this is the  matrix representing the bilinear form.

In coordinates, it may be represented by a  matrix depending on spacetime position. Minkowski space is thus a comparatively simple special case of a Lorentzian manifold.

Elements of Minkowski space are called events. It is perhaps the simplest example of a pseudo-Riemannian manifold.

Then mathematically, the metric is a bilinear form on an abstract four-dimensional real vector space , that is, 

By making a choice of orthonormal basis , we can identify  with the space .

An interesting example of non-inertial coordinates for (part of) Minkowski spacetime are the Born coordinates. Another useful set of coordinates are the light-cone coordinates.

Pseudo-Euclidean metrics 

The Minkowski inner product is not an inner product, since it is not positive-definite, i.e. the quadratic form  need not be positive for nonzero . The positive-definite condition has been replaced by the weaker condition of non-degeneracy. The bilinear form is said to be indefinite.
The Minkowski metric  is the metric tensor of Minkowski space. It is a pseudo-Euclidean metric, or more generally a constant pseudo-Riemannian metric in Cartesian coordinates. As such it is a nondegenerate symmetric bilinear form, a type  tensor.

The latter is generally reserved for the -vector part (to be introduced below) of a -vector.

The definition 

It is also called the relativistic dot product. If the two arguments are the same,

the resulting quantity will be called the Minkowski norm squared. The Minkowski inner product satisfies the following properties.

 Linearity in first argument
 
 Symmetry
 
 Non-degeneracy
 

The first two conditions imply bilinearity. The defining difference between a pseudo-inner product and an inner product proper is that the former is not required to be positive definite, that is,  is allowed.

The most important feature of the inner product and norm squared is that these are quantities unaffected by Lorentz transformations. In fact, it can be taken as the defining property of a Lorentz transformation that it preserves the inner product (i.e. the value of the corresponding bilinear form on two vectors). This approach is taken more generally for all classical groups definable this way in classical group. There, the matrix  is identical in the case  (the Lorentz group) to the matrix  to be displayed below.

A vector  is called a unit vector if . A basis for  consisting of mutually orthogonal unit vectors is called an orthonormal basis.

For a given inertial frame, an orthonormal basis in space, combined with the unit time vector, forms an orthonormal basis in Minkowski space. The number of positive and negative unit vectors in any such basis is a fixed pair of numbers, equal to the signature of the bilinear form associated with the inner product. This is Sylvester's law of inertia.

More terminology (but not more structure): The Minkowski metric is a pseudo-Riemannian metric, more specifically, a Lorentzian metric, even more specifically, the Lorentz metric, reserved for -dimensional flat spacetime with the remaining ambiguity only being the signature convention.

Minkowski metric 

This quantity is not consistently named in the literature. The interval is sometimes referred to as the square root of the interval as defined here.

The invariance of the interval under coordinate transformations between inertial frames follows from the invariance of

provided the transformations are linear. This quadratic form can be used to define a bilinear form

via the polarization identity. This bilinear form can in turn be written as

While possibly confusing, it is common practice to denote  with just . The matrix is read off from the explicit bilinear form as

and the bilinear form

with which this section started by assuming its existence, is now identified.

For definiteness and shorter presentation, the signature  is adopted below. This choice (or the other possible choice) has no (known) physical implications. The symmetry group preserving the bilinear form with one choice of signature is isomorphic (under the map given here) with the symmetry group preserving the other choice of signature. This means that both choices are in accord with the two postulates of relativity. Switching between the two conventions is straightforward.

Standard basis 
A standard or orthonormal basis for Minkowski space is a set of four mutually orthogonal vectors  such that

These conditions can be written compactly in the form

Relative to a standard basis, the components of a vector  are written  where the Einstein notation is used to write . The component  is called the timelike component of  while the other three components are called the spatial components. The spatial components of a -vector  may be identified with a -vector .

and

Here lowering of an index with the metric was used.

There are many possible choices of standard basis obeying the condition  Any two such bases are related in some sense by a Lorentz transformation, either by a change-of-basis matrix , a real  matrix satisfying 

or  a linear map on the abstract vector space satisfying, for any pair of vectors 

Raising and lowering of indices

Just as an authentic inner product on a vector space with one argument fixed, by Riesz representation theorem, may be expressed as the action of a linear functional on the vector space, the same holds for the Minkowski inner product of Minkowski space.

Thus if  are the components of a vector in a tangent space, then  are the components of a vector in the cotangent space (a linear functional). Due to the identification of vectors in tangent spaces with vectors in  itself, this is mostly ignored, and vectors with lower indices are referred to as covariant vectors. In this latter interpretation, the covariant vectors are (almost always implicitly) identified with vectors (linear functionals) in the dual of Minkowski space. The ones with upper indices are contravariant vectors. The components of this inverse are denoted . It happens that .

Contravariant and covariant vectors are geometrically very different objects. The first can and should be thought of as arrows. A linear functional can be characterized by two objects: its kernel, which is a hyperplane passing through the origin, and its norm. Geometrically thus, covariant vectors should be viewed as a set of hyperplanes, with spacing depending on the norm (bigger = smaller spacing), with one of them (the kernel) passing through the origin. The mathematical term for a covariant vector is 1-covector or 1-form (though the latter is usually reserved for covector fields).

 uses a vivid analogy with wave fronts of a de Broglie wave (scaled by a factor of Planck's reduced constant) quantum mechanically associated to a momentum four-vector to illustrate how one could imagine a covariant version of a contravariant vector. The inner product of two contravariant vectors could equally well be thought of as the action of the covariant version of one of them on the contravariant version of the other. The inner product is then how many time the arrow pierces the planes. The mathematical reference, offers the same geometrical view of these objects (but mentions no piercing).

The electromagnetic field tensor is a differential 2-form, which geometrical description can as well be found in MTW.

One may, of course, ignore geometrical views all together (as is the style in e.g.  and ) and proceed algebraically in a purely formal fashion. The time-proven robustness of the formalism itself, sometimes referred to as index gymnastics, ensures that moving vectors around and changing from contravariant to covariant vectors and vice versa (as well as higher order tensors) is mathematically sound. Incorrect expressions tend to reveal themselves quickly.

Coordinate free raising and lowering

 

The lowered vector  is then the dual map .

Non-degeneracy is then equivalent to injectivity of the partial evaluation map, or equivalently non-degeneracy tells us the kernel of the map is trivial. This then allows definition of the inverse partial evaluation map,

which allows us to define the inverse metric

where the two different usages of  can be told apart by the argument each is evaluated on. This can then be used to raise indices. If we work in a coordinate basis, we find that the metric  is indeed the matrix inverse to

The formalism of the Minkowski metric
The present purpose is to show semi-rigorously how formally one may apply the Minkowski metric to two vectors and obtain a real number, i.e. to display the role of the differentials, and how they disappear in a calculation. The setting is that of smooth manifold theory, and concepts such as convector fields and exterior derivatives are introduced.

A full-blown version of the Minkowski metric in coordinates as a tensor field on spacetime has the appearance

Explanation: The coordinate differentials are 1-form fields. They are defined as the exterior derivative of the coordinate functions . The tensor product (denoted by the symbol ) yields a tensor field of type , i.e. the type that expects two contravariant vectors as arguments. On the right hand side, the symmetric product (denoted by the symbol  or by juxtaposition) has been taken. The equality holds since, by definition, the Minkowski metric is symmetric. The notation on the far right is also sometimes used for the related, but different, line element. It is not a tensor. For elaboration on the differences and similarities, see 

Tangent vectors are, in this formalism, given in terms of a basis of differential operators of the first order,

where  is an event.

The exterior derivative  of a function  is a covector field, i.e. an assignment of a cotangent vector to each point , by definition such that

for each vector field . A vector field is an assignment of a tangent vector to each point .

at each . Furthermore, one has

for general one-forms on a tangent space  and general tangent vectors . (This can be taken as a definition, but may also be proved in a more general setting.)

Thus when the metric tensor is fed two vectors fields , both expanded in terms of the basis coordinate vector fields, the result is

where ,  are the component functions of the vector fields.

As mentioned, in a vector space, such as that modelling the spacetime of special relativity, tangent vectors can be canonically identified with vectors in the space itself, and vice versa. This means that the tangent spaces at each point are canonically identified with each other and with the vector space itself. This explains how the right hand side of the above equation can be employed directly, without regard to spacetime point the metric is to be evaluated and from where (which tangent space) the vectors come from.

This situation changes in general relativity. There one has

where now , i.e.,  is still a metric tensor but now depending on spacetime and is a solution of Einstein's field equations. Moreover,  must be tangent vectors at spacetime point  and can no longer be moved around freely.

Chronological and causality relations

Let . We say that

  chronologically precedes  if  is future-directed timelike. This relation has the transitive property and so can be written . 
  causally precedes  if  is future-directed null or future-directed timelike. It gives a partial ordering of spacetime and so can be written .

Suppose x ∈ M is timelike. Then the simultaneous hyperplane for x is  Since this hyperplane varies as x varies, there is a relativity of simultaneity in Minkowski space.

Generalizations 

A Lorentzian manifold is a generalization of Minkowski space in two ways. The total number of spacetime dimensions is not restricted to be   ( or more) and a Lorentzian manifold need not be flat, i.e. it allows for curvature.

Complexified Minkowski space 
Its real part is the Minkowski space of four-vectors, such as the four-velocity and the four-momentum, which are independent of the choice of orientation of the space. The imaginary part, on the other hand, may consist of four-pseudovectors, such as angular velocity and magnetic moment, which change their direction with a change of orientation. We introduce a pseudoscalar   which also changes sign with a change of orientation.

Generalized Minkowski space 
Minkowski space refers to a mathematical formulation in four dimensions. However, the mathematics can easily be extended or simplified to create an analogous generalized Minkowski space in any number of dimensions. These generalizations are used in theories where spacetime is assumed to have more or less than  dimensions. String theory and M-theory are two examples where . In string theory, there appears conformal field theories with  spacetime dimensions.

de Sitter space can be formulated as a submanifold of generalized Minkowski space as can the model spaces of hyperbolic geometry (see below).

Curvature 
As a flat spacetime, the three spatial components of Minkowski spacetime always obey the Pythagorean Theorem. Minkowski space is a suitable basis for special relativity, a good description of physical systems over finite distances in systems without significant gravitation. However, in order to take gravity into account, physicists use the theory of general relativity, which is formulated in the mathematics of a non-Euclidean geometry. When this geometry is used as a model of physical space, it is known as curved space.

Even in curved space, Minkowski space is still a good description in an infinitesimal region surrounding any point (barring gravitational singularities). More abstractly, we say that in the presence of gravity spacetime is described by a curved 4-dimensional manifold for which the tangent space to any point is a 4-dimensional Minkowski space. Thus, the structure of Minkowski space is still essential in the description of general relativity.

Geometry 

The meaning of the term geometry for the Minkowski space depends heavily on the context. Minkowski space is not endowed with a Euclidean geometry, and not with any of the generalized Riemannian geometries with intrinsic curvature, those exposed by the model spaces in hyperbolic geometry (negative curvature) and the geometry modeled by the sphere (positive curvature). The reason is the indefiniteness of the Minkowski metric. Minkowski space is, in particular, not a metric space and not a Riemannian manifold with a Riemannian metric. However, Minkowski space contains submanifolds endowed with a Riemannian metric yielding hyperbolic geometry.

By comparison, model spaces with positive curvature are just spheres in Euclidean space of one higher dimension. Hyperbolic spaces can be isometrically embedded in spaces of one more dimension when the embedding space is endowed with the Minkowski metric .

Define  to be the upper sheet of the hyperboloid

in generalized Minkowski space  of spacetime dimension . This is one of the surfaces of transitivity of the generalized Lorentz group. The induced metric on this submanifold,

the pullback of the Minkowski metric  under inclusion, is a Riemannian metric. With this metric  is a Riemannian manifold. It is one of the model spaces of Riemannian geometry, the hyperboloid model of hyperbolic space. It is a space of constant negative curvature . A  corresponds to the Poincaré disk model, while  corresponds to the Poincaré half-space model of dimension .

Preliminaries 
In the definition above  is the inclusion map and the superscript star denotes the pullback. The present purpose is to describe this and similar operations as a preparation for the actual demonstration that  actually is a hyperbolic space.

Hyperbolic stereographic projection 

In order to exhibit the metric, it is necessary to pull it back via a suitable parametrization. The parametrization to be used is the inverse of hyperbolic stereographic projection. It is instructive to compare to stereographic projection for spheres.

Stereographic projection  and its inverse  are given by

where, for simplicity, .

Pulling back the metric 
One has

and the map

The pulled back metric can be obtained by straightforward methods of calculus;

One computes according to the standard rules for computing differentials (though one is really computing the rigorously defined exterior derivatives),

and substitutes the results into the right hand side. This yields

This last equation shows that the metric on the ball is identical to the Riemannian metric  in the Poincaré ball model, another standard model of hyperbolic geometry.

See also
 Hyperspace
 Introduction to the mathematics of general relativity
 Minkowski plane

Remarks

Notes

References

 Giulini D The rich structure of Minkowski space, https://arxiv.org/abs/0802.4345v1

 
Published translation: 
Wikisource translation: The Fundamental Equations for Electromagnetic Processes in Moving Bodies
 Various English translations on Wikisource: Space and Time
 

 Wikisource translation: On the Dynamics of the Electron
 Robb A A:  Optical Geometry of Motion; a New View of the Theory of Relativity Cambridge 1911, (Heffers). http://www.archive.org/details/opticalgeometryoOOrobbrich
 Robb A A: Geometry of Time and Space, 1936 Cambridge Univ Press http://www.archive.org/details/geometryoftimean032218mbp

External links

  visualizing Minkowski space in the context of special relativity.
 The Geometry of Special Relativity: The Minkowski Space - Time Light Cone
 Minkowski space at PhilPapers

Equations of physics
Geometry
 
Lorentzian manifolds
Special relativity
Exact solutions in general relativity
Hermann Minkowski